The Turkey national futsal team represents Turkey in international futsal competitions such as the FIFA Futsal World Cup and the European Championships and is controlled by the Turkish Football Federation, which founded the national team in 2006.

Tournament records

All time general statistics record/Overview of results
 As a 15 Nov 2016

 one match not record in futsal planet (TUR 1-1 FIN 2014 - Turkey win 3–1 in penalty - in total 4–2)
 Source:http://www.futsalplanet.com/matches/index.asp

FIFA Futsal World Cup

UEFA European Futsal Championship

Minor tournament
this table consist of only senior A team Results (not include Youth and club match results)

Results

FIFA Futsal World Cup Qualification

UEFA European Futsal Championship Qualification

UEFA European Futsal Championship

Friendly Match

Coaching staff
Ömer Kaner - Head Coach
Sinan Turhan - Assistant Coach
Reşat Kartal- Assistant Coach
Cüneyt Yalınkılıç - Director

Current squad
The current squad. All match statistics are updated up to 16 February 2008.
Goalkeepers
Hüseyin Yıldız
Cüneyt Vicil
Players
Sami Bayraktar
Mahmut Demir
Serkan Demirel
Abdullah Doğan
Mesut Doğan
Yasin Erdal
Abdullah İçel
Ersan Keleş
Cihan Özcan
Aziz Sağlam
Samet Ersöz
Ertan Uyanık
Okan Soykan
Hakan Soykan

Notable players
Erol Bulut
Tayfun Korkut

See also
Turkey national football team
Turkey women's national football team
Turkey national youth football team
Turkey national under-21 football team

References

External links
Futsal page on TFF.org 
https://www.the-sports.org/futsal-turkey-results-identity-equ47187.html
http://theroonba.com/futsal/men/2021.html
http://www.futsalplanet.com/
http://www.futsalplanet.com/history.aspx
http://old.futsalplanet.com/matches/index.asp

European national futsal teams
Futsal
National